
Żnin County is a unit of territorial administration and local government (powiat) in Kuyavian-Pomeranian Voivodeship, north-central Poland. It came into being on January 1, 1999, as a result of the Polish local government reforms passed in 1998.

As of 2019 its total population is 68,113, out of which the population of Żnin is 13,864, that of Barcin is 7,408, that of Łabiszyn is 4,472, that of Janowiec Wielkopolski is 3,953, and the rural population is 38,416.

Neighbouring counties
Żnin County is bordered by Nakło County to the north, Bydgoszcz County to the north-east, Inowrocław County to the east, Mogilno County to the south-east, Gniezno County to the south and Wągrowiec County to the west.

Administrative division
The county is subdivided into six gminas (four urban-rural and two rural). These are listed in the following table, in descending order of population.

References

 
Land counties of Kuyavian-Pomeranian Voivodeship